Katz Broadcasting, LLC, doing business as Scripps Networks, is an American specialized digital multicasting network media company and a subsidiary of E. W. Scripps Company. The company owns (as of 2023) eight television networks that each carry programming with specified formats targeted at individual demographics.

Originally, Katz sold the network to affiliated TV stations via ad split, but by October 2015, had moved to carriage fees in exchange for the network getting the ad inventory due to greater inventory with stations adding a third or fourth subchannel.:1 Their networks used direct response advertising as a meter of viewers before switching to Nielsen rating C-3.:3

History

Katz Broadcasting, LLC was founded on February 3, 2014, by Jonathan Katz, who serves as chief operating officer of Bounce TV and formerly served as an executive at the Turner Broadcasting System. The company was announced concurrently with the announced launches of its first two networks, Escape and Grit, which were both launched that April with Univision and UniMás owned-and-operated stations run by Univision Communications serving as its charter station group; both of Katz's initial networks are targeted at individual genders (with Grit aimed at men and Escape aimed at women). Besides Jonathan Katz, some of the initial investors included some Bounce investors notably Gray Television and Al Haymon. At some point, E. W. Scripps Company also becomes an owner purchasing 5% of the company.

Katz and Bounce Media share staff from the former company's launch, including Jonathan Katz (who serves as president and chief executive officer of Katz, while continuing to serve as chief operating officer) and Jeffrey Wolf (Katz's chief distribution officer and Bounce's executive vice president of network distribution). Katz and Bounce continued to share executive staff with the hiring announcement of Jim Weiss (a former executive at sports marketing agency CSE) as the former's senior vice president of corporate communications in August.

On January 18, 2015, Katz Broadcasting announced the launch of its third specialty network, Laff, a comedy-focused network that was tapped for an April 15 debut with ABC Owned Television Stations and Scripps serving as its core charter affiliate groups. On March 24, 2015, Katz signed a multi-network agreement with the Meredith Corporation that would add all three Katz-owned networks to Meredith-owned stations in five markets, boosting Laff's national coverage to 50%, Escape's to 58%, and Grit's to 78% of all U.S. television markets. Escape and Grit switched from direct response advertising as a meter of viewers to Nielsen rating C-3 late 2015 with Laff expected to follow suit.:3

On June 15, 2016, Katz Broadcasting signed a multi-network agreement with Nexstar Broadcasting Group and operated affiliated TV station companies that would bring all three Katz-owned networks (as well as Bounce TV) to stations owned and/or operated by Nexstar in 54 markets, jumping national coverage of both Escape and Laff to 85% and Grit's coverage to 93%.

On August 1, 2017, Scripps announced the purchase of Katz and its three networks plus Bounce which Katz operates, for $292 million, acquiring the other 95% of the company. Katz will remain based out of Atlanta, Georgia as an autonomous division of Scripps. The purchase was completed on October 2, 2017.

In December 2018, Turner Broadcasting sold the rights to the brand and programming library of defunct cable network Court TV (which relaunched as TruTV in 2008) to Katz, who re-launched it as an over-the-air digital network in May 2019. On September 30, 2019, Katz Broadcasting rebranded Escape as Court TV Mystery to make it a Court TV brand extension.

Following Scripps' acquisition of Ion Media in 2021, the Katz-owned networks were moved over to the subchannels of Ion-owned stations beginning February 27, 2021.

On March 2, 2021, Scripps announced that it would launch two new complementary multicast networks, Defy TV and TrueReal, in the aftermath of Scripps' acquisition of Ion Media and television transmitters across the United States. The channels are part of Scripps's strategy to increase penetration among cord cutters that do not have traditional pay TV packages.

Both services launched on July 1 with 92 percent national coverage, mostly on Ion transmitters but also on subchannels of some Scripps local TV stations and by agreement with other station groups.

On April 6, 2021, Scripps announced that it would expand Newsy into a free over-the-air network, as well as being available on streaming platforms, starting October 1. The network would be available over-the-air on Scripps-owned Ion Television stations, along with some traditional Scripps stations without an Ion sister station and the former Ion-owned stations transferred to Inyo Broadcast Holdings, along with offering the network to other station groups. It also announced plans to relocate Newsy's national headquarters to Atlanta.

In advance of the move exclusively to over-the-air distribution, Scripps began to notify traditional cable and satellite providers, along with Internet television providers, at the end of March that it would end distribution of Newsy via those means effectively on June 30, 2021. The Newsy over-the-air network launched on October 1, 2021.

On February 24, 2022, the Court TV Mystery network was rebranded as Ion Mystery, with the "Ion" brand now more established regarding procedural dramas in general, including Ion Mystery's overall programming, whereas Court TV is more associated with its news division.

On March 10, 2023, Scripps announced that TrueReal would shut down on March 27 of that month, merging its programming with that of Defy TV. After its closure, Scripps will lease the open spectrum on its owned and operated stations to Jewelry Television.

Major assets

Television networks
 Bounce Media, LLC
 Bounce TV – a digital broadcast network which specializes in programming for the black community.
 Bounce XL – an over-the-top (OTT) streaming counterpart of Bounce TV
 Brown Sugar – an over-the-top (OTT) streaming service featuring 1970s black films and TV series
 Court TV (Court TV Media, LLC) – a digital broadcast network specializing in crime-themed programs such as true crime documentary series, legal dramas, and coverage of prominent criminal cases.
 Ion Mystery (Escape Media, LLC) – a digital broadcast network which specializes in programming for women, featuring series and films focusing on mystery and true crime stories.
 Grit Media, LLC
 Grit (Grit Media, LLC) – a digital broadcast network which specializes in programming for men, featuring mainly western series and films.
 GritXtra – an over-the-top (OTT) streaming counterpart of Grit
 Laff (Laff Media, LLC) – a digital broadcast network specializing in comedy programming, featuring a mix of feature films and archived sitcoms.
 Scripps News (Scripps Media, LLC) – a digital broadcast network which specializes in national news programming.
 Defy TV (Defy TV Media, LLC) – a digital broadcast network which specializes in unscripted programming for men and women.
 Ion Media, LLC
 Ion Television – a digital broadcast network which specializes in general entertainment.
 Ion Plus – an over-the-top (OTT) streaming counterpart of Ion Television; formerly a digital broadcast television network

Former assets
 Qubo – A digital broadcast network which specialized in children's programming. Ceased operations on February 28, 2021.
 TrueReal – a digital broadcast network which specialized in lifestyle and reality programming. Ceased operations on March 27, 2023.

Affiliate stations
 List of Bounce TV affiliates
 List of Ion Mystery affiliates
 List of Laff affiliates

References

External links
 

Companies based in Atlanta
Mass media companies established in 2014
American companies established in 2014
Television broadcasting companies of the United States
Mass media companies of the United States
2014 establishments in Georgia (U.S. state)
E. W. Scripps Company
2017 mergers and acquisitions